Brijest is a village in the municipalities of Lopare (Republika Srpska) and Teočak, Tuzla Canton, Bosnia and Herzegovina.

Demographics 
According to the 2013 census, its population was 201, all Serbs with 196 of them living in the Lopare part, and 5 in Teočak.

References

Populated places in Teočak
Populated places in Lopare